The Tsetse was a small American nuclear bomb developed in the 1950s that was used as the primary in several US thermonuclear bombs and as a small stand-alone weapon of its own. 

The Tsetse had a boosted composite core which used 2.25 kg Pu-239, 1.4kg U-235 and 6g tritium. The nominal yield was 10 kilotons. The design was shared with the UK where the anglicised version was known as Tony. The difference between Tsetse and Tony was in the high explosives used. The UK considered the PBX 9404 too shock sensitive and replaced it by EDC-11. This reduced the nominal yield to 8.5 kilotons. 

The Tsetse primary was used in the US B43 nuclear bomb, W44 nuclear warhead, W50 nuclear warhead, B57 nuclear bomb, and W59 nuclear warhead, according to researcher Chuck Hansen.

After deployment of the B43 two problems were identified in the primary. In 1961 Los Alamos scientists concluded that the primary was not one point safe under all conditions. A long series of tests was needed to develop a safe version. The second problem was related to tritium aging. To investigate a lifetime extension of the B43 an aged B43 was fired. The test resulted in half the yield. This was quite a shock as it affected not only the B43 but all similar weapons. The solution was to more frequently replenish the tritium supply.   
This problem was apparently shared by the Python primary designs.

Characteristics of these weapons are:

See also
 List of nuclear weapons
 Teller-Ulam design
 Python primary

References
Notes

Bibliography

Nuclear bombs of the United States